Dhamli is a village located 35 km south of Pali Rajasthan.

Established in the 17th century, was granted as jagir to Budhsinghji of Harsolav, Champawat clan of Rathores by Maharaja Abhay Singhji of Jodhpur for their heroic efforts in the battle of Ahmedabad in the year 1780.

Name is derived from Dhamaji Charan an early inhabitant of the village.

Dhamli is on bank of river, it has a long history. Well known heritage hotel Fort Dhamli is located here.

Temples
Temples of Shri Mahadeoji, Shri Bheruji, Shri Charbuja, Shri hanumanji, Shri Aaimataji, Shri Jod kiya mamaji, Shri Ramdevji, Shri jain temple & Dadavari are very popular.
Recently 450-year-old Charbhuja Mandir is renovated.

External links

Villages in Pali district